Hendrik Johannes "Hennie" Otto (born 25 June 1976) is a South African professional golfer.

Otto was born in Boksburg. He has played golf on the European Tour since 2000 having graduated from the Challenge Tour, but has only finished within the top 100 on the Order of Merit twice, in 2003 when he finished tied for tenth at The Open Championship on his major championship début and in 2008 when he won the Italian Open and finished 37th on the Order of Merit.

Otto has won 13 times on the Sunshine Tour since 1999. He won his second title on the European Tour (co-sanctioned by the Sunshine Tour) at the South African Open Championship in November 2011.

Professional wins (16)

European Tour wins (3)

1Co-sanctioned by the Sunshine Tour

European Tour playoff record (0–1)

Sunshine Tour wins (13)

1Co-sanctioned by the European Tour

Sunshine Tour playoff record (1–2)

Challenge Tour wins (1)

Challenge Tour playoff record (1–0)

Results in major championships

CUT = missed the half-way cut
"T" = tied
Note: Otto never played in the Masters Tournament or the U.S. Open.

Results in World Golf Championships

"T" = Tied
Note that the HSBC Champions did not become a WGC event until 2009.

Team appearances
Amateur
Eisenhower Trophy (representing South Africa): 1996

References

External links

South African male golfers
Sunshine Tour golfers
European Tour golfers
People from Boksburg
Sportspeople from Gauteng
White South African people
1976 births
Living people